José Fernando Emilio "Fher" Olvera Sierra (born 8 December 1959) is a Mexican rock musician, singer, and songwriter, best known as the secondary guitarist, composer, and lead singer for the Mexican rock band Maná, the most successful Latin American band of all time with over 40 million albums sold worldwide.

Biography

Early career
Born as José Fernando Emilio Olvera, he started his musical career as a teenager playing with Gustavo Orozco and the brothers Ulises, Juan Diego and Abraham Calleros in Guadalajara; forming a band called Sombrero Verde in the 80s.

Maná
With Abraham Calleros and Gustavo Orozco switching interests, Olvera continued his musical trajectory with the Calleros, Juan Diego (bass), Ulises (lead guitar) and himself (vocals and backup guitar), and a new member: Alejandro González (drums). The band recreated itself with a new name in 1987: Maná. The current members are:

Fher Olvera — lead vocals, electric guitar, acoustic guitar, rhythm guitar, harmonica.
Alex González — drums, backup vocals.
Juan Calleros — bass guitar, acoustic bass guitar.
Sergio Vallín — electric guitar, acoustic guitar.

Personal life
Olvera's father died when he was 7 years old. His mother died when he was making the album Drama y Luz. Olvera has a child, Dalí, with his ex-girlfriend Ana Ivette Verduzco. He later had a 4-year relationship with TV host Monica Noguera.  He keeps a close relationship with fellow band members, especially with Ulises Calleros and Alex González.

He made an appearance in Coldplay's 2022 Tour Music of the spheres singing "Rayando el Sol" along with the Coldplay members in the Akron Stadium in Guadalajara, Jalisco on 29 March 2022.

References

External links
 http://www.mana.com.mx/

1959 births
Mexican guitarists
Mexican male guitarists
Mexican male singer-songwriters
Mexican singer-songwriters
Latin Grammy Award winners
Latin Recording Academy Person of the Year honorees
People from Puebla (city)
Living people
Mexican activists
Maná members
Grammy Award winners
Latin music songwriters
Latin music record producers